Paul O'Donovan (born 19 April 1994) is an Irish lightweight rower. He is an Olympic gold medallist in lightweight double sculls where he set a new world's best time for that event and is a five-time world champion in single and double sculls. 

O'Donovan first won a world championship in the men's lightweight single sculls at the 2016 World Rowing Championships. Together with his brother Gary, he won silver in the Men's lightweight double sculls at the 2016 Summer Olympics, and gold in the same discipline at the 2018 World Rowing Championships. Since 2019, he also partnered with Fintan McCarthy for lightweight double sculls events, and the pair became world champions at the 2019 World Rowing Championships, gold medalists at the 2021 European Rowing Championships, and gold medalists (and world record holders) at the 2020 Tokyo Olympics.

Early life
Paul O'Donovan was born on 19 April 1994 in Lisheen near Skibbereen, County Cork to Teddy and Trish O'Donovan. Like his elder brother Gary, he attended Lisheen National School and St Fachtna's De La Salle secondary school in Skibbereen. Paul O'Donovan entered UCD in 2012 on an Ad Astra Elite Athlete Scholarship  and graduated with a BSc in Physiotherapy from University College Dublin in 2017. As of mid-2021, he was studying medicine at University College Cork.

O'Donovan was introduced to rowing in 2001 aged around seven when his father took the two brothers to Skibbereen Rowing Club. His father, himself a rower, coached them in the sport and remained a coach to O'Donovan until 2013.

He is the third cousin of Irish Olympic rowing bronze medalist Emily Hegarty.

Rowing career
In 2008, the O'Donovan brothers were selected for the Irish junior team at the Home International Regatta held in Cardiff, Wales, and won gold in the junior quad sculls. Paul O'Donovan also competed in the single sculls; he became the junior single sculls champion of Ireland when he was 15, and was placed fourth in the 2011 World Junior Championships.  When he was 19, he won the bronze medal in the men's lightweight sculls at the World Rowing U23 Championships held in Linz, Austria.

2016
In April 2016. Paul and Gary O'Donovan won silver in the lightweight double sculls at the first World Rowing Cup events of the year in Varese, Italy.  In the following month in May 2016, the pair won the 2016 European Rowing Championships gold medal in Brandenburg, Germany.

The O'Donovan brothers had narrowly qualified for the Rio Olympics by beating Greece at the 2015 World Championship.   In August 2016 at the Rio Olympics, the O'Donovan brothers won silver behind France in the lightweight double sculls, the first rowing medal won by Ireland at the Olympics.

Two weeks later, he won the lightweight single sculls final at the 2016 World Rowing Championships in Rotterdam, Netherlands.

2017
The brothers finished in the silver position in men's lightweight double sculls at the 2017 European Rowing Championships. They also won silver at the second World Rowing Cup regatta of the season in Poland in June, and bronze at the third in July.

At the 2017 World Rowing Championships in Florida, Paul O'Donovan won gold at the lightweight men's single sculls.  His brother Gary was ill and they did not take part in the lightweight men's double sculls event.

2018
During 2018, the O'Donovan brothers won silver in the lightweight double sculls at the 2018 European Rowing Championships in August, and became world champions in the same discipline at the 2018 World Rowing Championships in September.

2019
O'Donovan was paired with Fintan McCarthy instead of his brother Gary at the 2019 World Rowing Championships held at Linz-Ottensheim in Austria. The pair won gold in the lightweight double sculls event, which ensured qualification for the Irish team at the 2020 Summer Olympics in Tokyo.

2021
O'Donovan raced with McCarthy at the 2021 European Rowing Championships, where they won gold. The following month they won gold again at the World Rowing Cup II regatta in Lucerne. 

At the 2020 Tokyo Olympics, held in July 2021, the pair set a world's best time of 6:05:33 while winning their semifinal of the lightweight double sculls event. They went on to win the gold medal, finishing ahead of the German and Italian teams.

2022
After spending some of 2022 in Australia as part of his medical studies, O'Donovan reunited with McCarthy to claim gold for a 2nd year in a row at the 2022 European Rowing Championships.

References

External links

Paul O'Donovan at Rowing Ireland

1994 births
Irish male rowers
Living people
Olympic rowers of Ireland
Olympic silver medalists for Ireland
People from Skibbereen
Rowers at the 2016 Summer Olympics
Rowers at the 2020 Summer Olympics
Medalists at the 2016 Summer Olympics
Olympic medalists in rowing
World Rowing Championships medalists for Ireland
Medalists at the 2020 Summer Olympics
Olympic gold medalists for Ireland
21st-century Irish people